Calcicola is a genus in the Malpighiaceae, a family of about 75 genera of flowering plants in the order Malpighiales. Calcicola comprises 2 species of shrubs or treelets native to Mexico.

References
Anderson, W. R., and C. Davis, 2007. Generic adjustments in Neotropical Malpighiaceae. Contributions from the University of Michigan Herbarium 25: 137–166.

External links
Calcicola
Malpighiaceae Malpighiaceae - description, taxonomy, phylogeny, and nomenclature

Malpighiaceae
Malpighiaceae genera